Rajeev Ram was the defending champion, but the lost in the first round to Dominik Meffert.
Benjamin Becker won the title, defeating Andreas Seppi 6–1, 6–4 in the final.

Seeds

Draw

Finals

Top half

Bottom half

References
 Main Draw
 Qualifying Draw

Internazionali Tennis Val Gardena Sudtirol - Singles
2012 Singles